Vortis is a fictional planet in the (equally fictional) Isop galaxy, created by Bill Strutton and originally featuring in six 1965 BBC episodes of the British science fiction television series Doctor Who, collectively titled The Web Planet, and featuring William Hartnell as the First Doctor. It also appeared in an original Doctor Who novel, Twilight of the Gods, one of the Virgin Missing Adventures range. and an audio drama, Return to the Web Planet, produced by Big Finish Productions.

The popularity of The Web Planet meant that two of the species inhabiting Vortis, the ant-like Zarbi and the butterfly Menoptra, appeared twice in the 1966 Doctor Who Annual. One story, "Lair of the Zarbi Supremo" by David Whitaker, was released as an audio feature on the 2006 DVD release of the original adventure, read by one of its stars, William Russell.

Fictional history of Vortis
The planet appears to be cold, dark and lifeless, but nevertheless supports a breathable atmosphere, water and presumably food. Before the sinister Animus took control of the planet, Vortis was covered in a flower forest, which the Menoptra hoped would return.

Many years later after the Animus was apparently vanquished, Vortis drifted into the neighboring Rhumos system and was fought over by the Rhumons, who considered it a disputed territory. The Animus had also survived, until the intervention of a time traveller once more brought peace to the troubled world.

Species of Vortis

Menoptra

Resembling giant, humanoid butterflies and able to achieve space flight with their wings alone, the Menoptra were the original masters of Vortis until the Animus inveigled itself within the minds of the Zarbi. The Menoptra fled to Pictos, one of the moons of Vortis, eventually planning an invasion. Those that were captured were either killed or forced to work, once their wings had been removed by the Zarbi. That their attempt to retake their home world was a success was largely down to the efforts of the aforementioned party of time travellers.

Optera

In an apparent example of emerging speciation, some of the Menoptra fled underground, adapting to a subterranean environment and calling themselves the Optera. This species have lost the ability to fly, and resemble upright caterpillars, indicating that they had evolved through neoteny. They also have larger eyes than their Menoptra brethren. However, they have numerous arms and appear to 'hop' in a stylised way. With the Animus defeated, they appeared to believe that future generations of Optera would redevelop flight.

Venom Grubs
Unlike the other bipedal species of Vortis, Venom Grubs crawl along the ground. They were used as mobile weapons by the Zarbi, able to shoot venom from their snouts that proved fatal to all it touched. The Grubs were rendered harmless once the Zarbi were freed from the Animus's influence.

Venom Grubs were mentioned in the 2005 episode Boom Town, where it is implied that they are used to punish disobedient Slitheen.

Zarbi

The Zarbi resemble giant ants, and according to the Menoptra have been used as cattle in the planet's history. These insectoids lack intelligence, and so were easily enslaved by the malevolent Animus and used against the Menoptra. When the Animus's evil influence was lifted through the intervention of a mysterious time traveller and his human companions, the Zarbi returned to their docile state.

According to the novelisation of The Web Planet, the Zarbi reproduce through the "Zarbi Supremo", who acts like a queen bee. The Supremo also appeared in the 1966 Doctor Who Annual.

See also

Doctor Who
List of Doctor Who monsters and aliens
Whoniverse

Footnotes

External links

Doctor Who planets